Lewis D. Gallo (June 12, 1928 – June 11, 2000) was an American character actor and producer, best known for his role as Maj. Joseph Cobb on the 1960s ABC World War II series  Twelve O'Clock High.

Gallo was born in Mount Kisco, New York, and he served as an Army infantryman during the Korean War.

He also made appearances on other TV series including Rawhide, Dr. Kildare, Straightway, Lost in Space, The F.B.I., Gunsmoke, The Twilight Zone, Perry Mason, Tales of Wells Fargo, Combat!, and Get Smart. He also appeared in the films Ocean's 11, PT 109, and Pork Chop Hill.

Gallo appeared on Broadway in Will Success Spoil Rock Hunter? (1955).

As a producer he worked on such series as That Girl, Love, American Style, The Ghost & Mrs. Muir and The New Mike Hammer.

Gallo died on June 11, 2000, in Los Angeles, California, the day before his 72nd birthday. He was survived by his wife of 42 years, television producer Lillian Gallo. They had two children, Mary Ann and Tom.

Filmography

Television

References

External links
 
 

1928 births
2000 deaths
Male actors from New York (state)
American male television actors
People from Mount Kisco, New York
20th-century American male actors
Television producers from New York (state)